Class 350 may refer to:

British Rail Class 350, a class of electric multiple-unit passenger trains built by Siemens
Renfe Class 350, a series of single-cabin diesel locomotives in Spain built in the U.S. by the American Car and Foundry company 
Talgo 350, a Spanish high-speed train 
South Australian Railways 350 class, two diesel-electric locomotives built by the Islington Railway Workshops